The Faith Life! is the fifth contemporary worship music album originally released in the U.S. with worship leader Alvin Slaughter by Integrity/Hosanna! Music. The album was recorded live at Covenant Love Family Church in Fayetteville, North Carolina, and released in 2005. 'The Faith Life" captures the powerful songs and passionate voice of Alvin Slaughter at his finest. With a blend of gospel, funk, contemporary, and worship, this fifteen-song release includes "Sacrifice of Praise," "Launch Out," "My Joy," and more.

Track listing
My Joy
Speaking
My Joy (reprise)
Launch Out
When I Praise
Anything
Worshippers
Sacrifice Of Praise
Sacrifice Of Praise (reprise)
This I Know/I Have Decided to Follow Jesus
Lord I Run To You
The Latter Rain
Made Me Glad
Wave of My Anointing (Fresh Wind)
Faith Is the Key

Credits
Producers:
 Roger Ryan
 Alvin Slaughter

Executive Producer:
 Chris Thomason
 Jackie Patillo

Arrangers:
 Fred Vaughn - Vocal Arrangement
 Roger Ryan - String Arrangement

A&R Director::
 Jackie Patillo

Worship Leader:
 Alvin Slaughter

Liner Notes:
 Michael Coleman
 Alvin Slaughter

Musicians:
 Carl Albrecht - Drums
 Jason Gaines - Programming, Drum Programming
 Michael Ripoll - Guitar
 Virgil Staford - Keyboards, Piano, B-3 Organ
 Dana Reed - Guitar
 Bryant Russell - Bass
 Roger Ryan - Keyboards, Piano, Music Direction, Programming
 Lamar Carter - Drums
 Bobby Soverall - Keyboards
 Doug Moffett - Saxophone
 Steve Patrick - Trumpet
 Roy Agee - Trombone

Vocals (Background): 
 Gale West
 Keisha Frierson
 Grisanthia Stancil
 Shandra Penix
 Kimberly Mont
 Kimberly Fleming
 Mark Kibble

Choir:
 "Covenant Love Family Church"
 Bobby Soverall - Director

Engineers: 
 Paul Mills - Mixing engineer
 Jeff Pitzer - Engineer
 Hank Williams - Mastering
 Roger Ryan - Engineer
 Bobby Shin - Engineer, Mixing, Recording Coordinator, Mixing Assistant
 Daewook Jung - Engineer, Assistant Engineer
 Daewoo Kim - Engineer

2005 live albums
Alvin Slaughter albums